Nebria orientalis is a species of ground beetle in the Nebriinae subfamily that is endemic to Guangdong province of China.

References

orientalis
Beetles described in 1949
Endemic fauna of China
Beetles of Asia